William Hurley may refer to:

 William Hurley (Australian politician) (1848–1924), New South Wales politician
 William Hurley (carpenter), English carpenter (known works 1319–1354)
 William A. Hurley (died 1952), American Thoroughbred horse trainer
 William E. Hurley (1875–?), American politician in Massachusetts
 Dick Hurley (William H. Hurley, 1847–?), American baseball player
 Billy Hurley III (born 1982), American golfer
 whurley (William Hurley, born 1971), co-founder of Chaotic Moon Studios

See also
 Sir William Hurly, 3rd Baronet, MP, of the Hurly baronets
 Billy Hurley (disambiguation)